You may be looking for:
List of settlements in East Riding of Yorkshire by population
List of settlements in North Yorkshire by population
List of settlements in South Yorkshire by population
List of settlements in West Yorkshire by population